Daniel Brian Spohn (born October 12, 1984) is an American mixed martial artist currently competing in the Light Heavyweight division. A professional competitor since 2006, he has competed for the UFC, Bellator, and was a competitor on The Ultimate Fighter: Team Edgar vs. Team Penn.

Background
Spohn was born in Abilene, Texas on October 12, 1984 to Frank and Joan Spohn. Dan has one brother, Jonathan Spohn, two half brothers, Frank Spohn Jr. and Jason Hammonds, and two half sisters, Kelly and Christie. In 1996 Joan and her three sons, Jason, Dan, and Jonathan moved to Cambridge, Ohio where three years later Dan attended classes at Cambridge Mixed Martial Arts where he studied under Tim McConahay. Spohn attended John Glenn High School in New Concord, Ohio and graduated in 2003. Spohn began training in Kung Fu at the age of 12 and at age 14 began training in Aiki Jitsu. Dan has studied traditional Kachido Aikijitsu for the past 17 years under Sensei Tim McConahay. He holds the rank of 3rd degree black belt in the art, and serves as a part-time co-instructor at Cambridge Martial Arts dojo when he is back in his hometown. Spohn currently trains Brazilian jiu-jitsu under Vitor Oliveira at Ronin training center and holds the rank of Purple belt.

Mixed martial arts career

Early career
Spohn made his amateur MMA debut in 2006.  Over the next three and a half years, he amassed a record of 9-4.

In November 2009, Spohn made his professional MMA debut.  He was undefeated for the first two years of his career, with a record of 6 wins.  Daniel Spohn holds one of the fastest knockouts in Bellator history with a flying knee 9 second KO. He suffered his first professional defeat against Kelvin Tiller at Bellator 56 via split  decision. His next loss in Bellator also came by split decision against Slovak fighter Atilla Vegh.

The Ultimate Fighter
In March 2014, the UFC officially announced the list of fighters competing on The Ultimate Fighter: Team Edgar vs. Team Penn season with Spohn listed as one entrant.

Spohn made it onto the show by winning his preliminary match against Tyler King via spectacular 10 second knockout. UFC President Dana White called it the "probably the nastiest fucking knockout" of the entire show's history.  In the elimination round, Spohn faced Todd Monaghan and won by unanimous decision.  In the semifinals, he faced Matt Van Buren and lost via TKO in the second round after an exciting war which won "fight of the season".

Ultimate Fighting Championship
Despite not making it to the finals, Spohn was one of only two competitors from the series brought back to be featured on the finale.  He faced Team Edgar semifinalist Patrick Walsh on July 6, 2014. He lost the bout via unanimous decision and was subsequently released from the promotion.

Spohn is undefeated in 5 of his last 6  fights since being released from UFC and currently holds two regional titles. He is the current Gladiators of the Cage Light Heavyweight champion and also the CFFC Heavyweight Champion. Spohn declared that he is working his way back to the UFC.But, he is also took a career in PFL.

Professional Fighters League

Spohn faced Marthin Nielsen on April 29, 2021 at PFL 2 as the start of the 2021 PFL Light Heavyweight tournament. He lost the bout via technical submission to an arm-triangle choke in the second round.

Spohn faced Emiliano Sordi at PFL 5 on June 17, 2021. After Sordi was deducted a point in the first round due to strikes to the back of the head, the bout ended in a unanimous draw.

Post PFL 
Spohn was scheduled to face Satoshi Ishii at HEAT 50 on May 7, 2022. However, the bout was scrapped after Spohn tested positive for coronavirus.

Spohn faced Dequan Townsend on October 8, 2022 at Ohio Combat League 22. He won the bout via unanimous decision.

Personal life
Dan and his wife, Rachel, live in Hilliard with their six children.

Championships and accomplishments
North American Allied Fight Series
NAAFS Light Heavyweight Championship (One time)
Cage Fury Fighting Championships
CFFC Heavyweight Championship (One time)
AllianceMMA Heavyweight Champion (ITFightSeries) (Current)
Gladiators of the Cage LHW Champion (Current)

Mixed martial arts record

|-
|Win
|align=center|19–8–1
|Dequan Townsend
|Decision (unanimous)
|Ohio Combat League 22
|
|align=center|3
|align=center|5:00
|Columbus, Ohio, United States
|
|-
|Draw
|align=center|18–8–1
|Emiliano Sordi
|Draw (unanimous)
|PFL 5 
|
|align=center|3
|align=center|5:00
|Atlantic City, New Jersey, United States
|
|-
|Loss
|align=center|18–8
|Marthin Hamlet
|Technical Submission (arm-triangle choke)
| PFL 2
| 
| align=center|2 
| align=center|0:52
| Atlantic City, New Jersey, United States
|
|-
|Loss
|align=center|18–7
|Bazigit Atajev
|KO (punches)
| PFL 3
| 
| align=center| 1
| align=center| 3:25
| Uniondale, New York, United States
|
|-
|Loss
|align=center|18–6
|Sean O'Connell
|Decision (majority)
| PFL 9
| 
| align=center| 2
| align=center| 5:00
| Long Beach, California, United States
|
|-
|Win
|align=center|18–5
|Artur Alibulatov
|Decision (unanimous)
|PFL 5
|
|align=center|3
|align=center|5:00
|Uniondale, New York, United States
|
|-
|Win
|align=center|17–5
|Bazigit Ataev
|TKO (punches)
|PFL 2
|
|align=center|3
|align=center|4:31
|Chicago, Illinois, United States
|
|-
|Win
|align=center|16–5
|Angel DeAnda
|Submission (arm-triangle choke)
|Dana White's Contender Series 2
|
|align=center|1
|align=center|3:10
|Las Vegas, Nevada, United States
|
|-
| Win
|align=center| 15–5
|Flavio Rogerio Magon
| Decision (unanimous)  
| Hard Knocks 53
| 
|align=center| 3
|align=center| 5:00
| Calgary, Alberta, Canada
|
|-
| Win
|align=center| 14–5
|Jeff Hughes
| TKO (punches) 
| Alpha One Sports: IT Fight Series 48
| 
|align=center| 5
|align=center| 2:02
| Columbus, Ohio, United States
|
|-
| Win
|align=center| 13–5
|Rob Morrow
| TKO (punches) 
| GOTC MMA 21
| 
|align=center| 3
|align=center| 1:04
| Pittsburgh, Pennsylvania, United States
|
|-
| Loss
|align=center| 12–5
|Rodney Wallace
| Decision (unanimous) 
| Hard Knocks 48
| 
|align=center| 5
|align=center| 5:00
| Calgary, Alberta, Canada
|
|-
| Win
|align=center| 12–4
|Azunna Anyanwu
| TKO (punches)
| CFFC 53
| 
|align=center| 2
|align=center| 3:24
| Philadelphia, Pennsylvania, United States
|
|-
| Win
|align=center| 11–4
|Lewis Rumsey
| Decision (unanimous)
| Gladiators of the Cage 17
| 
|align=center| 3
|align=center| 5:00
| Butler, Pennsylvania, United States
| 
|-
| Win
|align=center| 10–4
|Marcus Finch
| TKO (punches)
| Absolute Cage Fighting
| 
|align=center| 3
|align=center| 3:15
| Columbus, Ohio, United States
|
|-
| Win
|align=center| 9–4
|Michael Cockerham
| Submission (arm-triangle choke)
| Alpha One Sports: IT Fight Series 29
| 
|align=center| 1
|align=center| 0:42
| Columbus, Ohio, United States
|
|-
| Loss
|align=center| 8–4
|Patrick Walsh
| Decision (unanimous)
| The Ultimate Fighter: Team Edgar vs. Team Penn Finale
| 
|align=center| 3
|align=center| 5:00
| Las Vegas, Nevada, United States
| 
|-
| Win
|align=center| 8–3
| Aaron Mays
|Submission (armbar)
| UVC 23: Invasion
|
|align=center| 1
|align=center| 2:41
| Columbus, Ohio, United States
|
|-
| Win
|align=center| 7–3
| Robert Morrow
|Submission (rear-naked choke)
| UVC 22: Mayhem
|
|align=center| 2
|align=center| 4:03
| Columbus, Ohio, United States
|
|-
| Loss
|align=center| 6–3
| Josh Stansbury
|Submission (guillotine choke)
| Bellator 71
|
|align=center| 1
|align=center| 2:30
| Chester, West Virginia, United States
|
|-
| Loss
|align=center| 6–2
| Attila Vegh
|Decision (split)
| Bellator 66
|
|align=center| 3
|align=center| 5:00
| Cleveland, Ohio, United States
|
|-
| Loss
|align=center| 6–1
| Kelvin Tiller
|Decision (split)
| Bellator 56
|
|align=center| 3
|align=center| 5:00
| Kansas City, Kansas, United States
|
|-
| Win
|align=center| 6–0
| Dane Bonnigson	
| KO (knee)
| Bellator 51
| 
|align=center| 1
|align=center| 0:09
| Canton, Ohio, United States
|
|-
| Win
|align=center| 5–0
| John Hawk
| Decision (unanimous)
| NAAFS: Spohn vs. Hawk 2
| 
|align=center| 5
|align=center| 5:00
| Streetsboro, Ohio, United States
| 
|-
| Win
|align=center| 4–0
| Josh Hendricks	
| TKO (doctor stoppage)
| NAAFS: Caged Fury 14
| 
|align=center| 1
|align=center| 1:57
| Cleveland, Ohio, United States
|
|-
| Win
|align=center| 3–0
| John Hawk
| Decision (unanimous)
| NAAFS: Rock N Rumble 4
| 
|align=center| 3
|align=center| 3:00
| Cleveland, Ohio, United States
|
|-
|  Win
|align=center| 2–0
| Christopher Thad Schlichter
| Decision (unanimous)
| NAAFS: Caged Fury 11
| 
|align=center| 3
|align=center| 3:00
| East Liverpool, Ohio, United States
|
|-
| Win
|align=center| 1–0
| Josh Stansbury
| Submission (guillotine choke)
| NAAFS: Caged Fury 8
| 
|align=center| 2
|align=center| 1:01
| East Liverpool, Ohio, United States
|

Mixed martial arts amateur record

|-
| Loss
|align=center| 5–2
| Jason Butcher
| Submission (rear-naked choke)
| NAAFS: Caged Fury 7
| 
|align=center| 2
|align=center| 1:38
| Cleveland, Ohio, United States
|
|-
| Win
|align=center| 5–1
| Lewis Rumsey
| TKO (punches)
| NAAFS: Rock N Rumble 3
| 
|align=center| 2
|align=center| 1:53
| Cleveland, Ohio, United States
|
|-
| Win
|align=center| 4–1
| Joshua Moore
| Decision (unanimous)
| NAAFS: North Coast Showdown 3
| 
|align=center| 3
|align=center| 3:00
| Sandusky, Ohio, United States
|
|-
| Loss
|align=center| 3–1
| Chuck Ellison
| KO (punch)
| NAAFS: North Coast Showdown 1
| 
|align=center| 1
|align=center| 0:40
| Euclid, Ohio, United States
|
|-
| Win
|align=center| 3–0
| Lou Ludwig
| TKO (punches)
| NAAFS: Thursday Night Fights
| 
|align=center| 1
|align=center| 1:36
| Akron, Ohio, United States
|
|-
| Win
|align=center| 2–0
| Dave Osborne
| Submission (rear-naked choke)
| NAAFS: Fight Night in the Flats 2
| 
|align=center| 1
|align=center| 1:00
| Cleveland, Ohio, United States
|
|-
| Win
|align=center| 1–0
| Anthony Pray
| KO (punches)
| NAAFS: Caged Fury 1
| 
|align=center| 2
|align=center| N/A
| Dover, Ohio, United States
|

See also
 List of male mixed martial artists

References

External links
 
 Dan Spohn at PFL
 
 

1984 births
Living people
American male mixed martial artists
Light heavyweight mixed martial artists
Mixed martial artists utilizing wushu
Mixed martial artists utilizing jujutsu
Mixed martial artists utilizing Brazilian jiu-jitsu
American wushu practitioners
American practitioners of Brazilian jiu-jitsu
American jujutsuka
People from Dublin, Ohio
People from Cambridge, Ohio
People from Columbus, Ohio